Leccinum aurantiellum is a species of bolete fungus in the family Boletaceae. Found in the United States, it was described as new to science in 1971 by Harry Delbert Thiers.

See also
List of Leccinum species
List of North American boletes

References

Fungi described in 1971
Fungi of the United States
aurantiellum
Fungi without expected TNC conservation status